Olivier Guez (born 15 June 1974) is a French journalist, essayist and writer. He won the 2017 Prix Renaudot for his novel The Disappearance of Josef Mengele (La disparition de Josef Mengele).

Life 
Guez was born and grew up in Strasbourg. His maternal grandmother introduced him to reading at a very young age.

He studied at Sciences Po Strasbourg, the London School of Economics and the College of Europe. He worked as a freelance journalist, for  The New York Times, Le Monde, the Frankfurter Allgemeine Zeitung, Le Figaro Magazine, L'Express, Le Point, Politique Internationale, Der Freitag, Der Tages Anzeiger, Das Magazin and Il Foglio.

Between 2000 and 2005, he worked as a reporter in the International Economy Department of La Tribune. He wrote Surveys and reports on Central Europe, Latin America, the Middle East, the European Union, and the geopolitics of oil. He wrote his first book, La Grande Alliance, in collaboration with Frédéric Encel,

In 2017, he wrote a biographical novel The Disappearance of Josef Mengele, (awarded the Prix Renaudot). It documents Josef Mengele (1911-1979), Nazi German officer, war criminal who worked as a doctor at Auschwitz. The Disappearance of Josef Mengele was one of eight novels in the second selection for the 2017 Prix Goncourt.

Works 

 The Grand Alliance. De la Chechnyaie à l'Irak, un nouvel ordre mondial, with Frédéric Encel, éditions Flammarion, 2003, 304 p. ISBN 2-08-210281-5
 The Impossible Return. Une histoire des Juifs en Allemagne depuis 1945, éditions Flammarion, 2007, 336 p. ISBN 978-2-08-210554-5
 La Chute du mur, with Jean-Marc Gonin, fayard editions, 2009, 359 p. ISBN 978-2-213-63312-1
 American Spleen. Un voyage d'Olivier Guez au cœur du déclin américain, éditions Flammarion, coll. « At large », 2012, 270 p. ISBN 978-2-08-126952-1 
 Éloge de l'esquive, éditions Flammarion, 2014, 107 p. ISBN 978-2-246-81189-3
 Les Révolutions de Jacques Koskas, éditions Belfond, 2014, 331 p. ISBN 978-2-7144-5792-9 
The Disappearance of Josef Mengele, éditions Grasset, 2017, 240 p.  ISBN 978-2-246-85587-3

References 

1974 births
Living people
Writers from Strasbourg
French male writers
Prix Renaudot winners
Alumni of the London School of Economics
College of Europe alumni
French screenwriters
French male non-fiction writers